Ponnambalamedu is a summit in the Western Ghat mountain ranges of Pathanamthitta District, Perunad grama panchayat, Kerala, India. It is located near the Sabarimala Ayyappan temple, where the annual Makaravilakku event is conducted in the presence of nearly half a million pilgrims annually.

Etymology
Ponnambalamedu is derived from the Malayalam words Pon (gold), Ambalam (temple) and Medu (hill). The compound word is meant to refer to the hill of the golden temple.

Location
The hill is in the Goodrickal range of the Ranni Forest Division and has been included as a part of the Periyar National Park, a tiger reserve. Ponnambalamedu has been characterized as an ecologically sensitive area by forest officials in the region and has been identified as a critical habitat for tigers. The hill is also near the Kochupamba Power Substation, owned and operated by the Kerala State Electricity Board. The substation supplies electricity to the Sabarimala temple. Access to the peak of Ponnambalamedu is through an unpaved forest road controlled by local forest department authorities.

History
Historically, the summit of the hill was a place of worship for the local tribal population. The rituals of these tribes, most notably the lighting of Makaravilakku, were taken over by the Travancore Devasvom Board following higher number of pilgrims visiting Sabarimala. There are also reports stating that there was an Ayyappan temple at the summit of the hill which was maintained by local tribes. It was reported that these tribal people began the ritual of Makaravilakku by lighting large quantities of camphor and wood, and subsequently quenching the flame using a wet blanket three times at the time of the annual festival. After the takeover by the Devasvom Board, a platform for lighting the flame was constructed in the place of the temple.

Today the annual festival is held at the Ayyappan temple in Sabarimala in the month of January. A holy flame is lit at Ponnambalamedu to commemorate the religious event. The event of Makaravilakku at Ponnambalamedu is witnessed by nearly half a million people each year.

Makaravilakku

Makaravilakku is the ritualistic lighting of a "holy flame" atop Ponnambalamedu during the annual festival at Sabarimala. This lighting of the flame at the summit of the hill marks the finale of the pilgrimage season at Sabarimala which lasts about two months. This flame is lit at the time of Deeparathana at the Sabarimala temple. The flame is lit using camphor at the summit. Makaravilakku, which was thought to be a miraculous event by most visiting pilgrims, was later proven to be a "make-believe" hoax, being lit by members of the Travancore Devasvom Board and local police, which eventually led to the deaths of many pilgrims in a stampede.

References

Hills of Kerala